The Hics are an English Electronic band formed in London in 2012 by Sam Paul Evans and Jacob Welsh. Originally a two piece electronic indie band, the band was soon joined by Matt Knox on bass, Roxane  Barker on vocals, Geordan Reid-Campbell on guitar and David Turay on saxophone. They released their first EP, Tangle, in 2013.

History
The band members met at Pimlico School, now Pimlico Academy, whilst on the music programme. The Hics were originally formed as a two piece electronic indie band between Evans and Welsh, and were later joined by Matt Knox on bass. After feeling something was missing, they called on their old schoolmates Rox Barker, who joined as vocalist, and  Geordan Reid-Campbell, who joined as guitarist. The band met their sixth member, Saxophonist David Turay, through the Jazz scene. The Hics got their name from hickory, the wood from which some drumsticks are made.

Their first single, "Lines", was released on 30 September 2012 through their SoundCloud page. The song was soon picked up by BBC Radio 6 Music DJ Gilles Peterson, who played the song on his radio show on 6 October 2012, and later included it on his compilation Brownswood Bubblers Nine, released on 10 December 2012.

In January 2013, the band were runners-up for the Best Breakthrough Act category at Gilles Peterson's Worldwide Awards. Their second single, "Cold Air", premiered on 16 February 2013 on Gilles Peterson's BBC Radio 6 Music show. The song was released 3 days later on 19 February 2013 to The Hics' SoundCloud page. In 6 March 2013, they were mentioned in the NME magazine. They released the track "Tangle" on 8 July 2013, as a teaser for their upcoming EP of the same name, which was released on 19 August 2013. The band played their first headline show at the 750 capacity Electrowerkz in London on 1 August 2013, to a sold-out crowd. The music video for the song "Tangle", their first music video, premiered on 3 September 2013. The song "Cold Air" was featured on the in-game radio station Worldwide FM of the 2013 video game Grand Theft Auto V.

In May 2014 the band released a new song on their SoundCloud page entitled "All We'll Know". The music video for the song premiered on 9 June 2014 and the song was officially released as a single on 16 June 2014. The Hics collaborated with drummer Richard Spaven on a song entitled "Whole Other*", which was released on his album of the same name on 7 July 2014. On 19 September 2014 The Hics were filmed for an appearance on the Channel 4 Four To The Floor series, performing their latest single "All We'll Know". The episode was broadcast on 1 October. In November 2014 The Hics' Saxophone player David Turay died. In mid-2015 The Hics were signed to the OddChild Music label. The result of the Little Simz collaboration, the song "Gratitude", premiered on BBC Radio 1 on 9 September 2015. The Hics' first new material in over a year, it was released on Little Simz' debut album on 18 September 2015. In late 2015, bass player Matt Knox departed the band.

The Hics are featured on the songs "Matches" and "Ricochet" in Too High to Riot, the second studio album by Sudanese-American Dreamville rapper Bas. The album was released on 4 March 2016.  On 15 April 2016 it was announced that The Hics would be embarking on a tour of the United States with Bas; The 26-show Too High To Riot tour began in Miami, Florida on 3 June and ended on 13 July 2016 in New York City. The music video for the song "Matches", filmed in Los Angeles and one of their collaborations with Bas, was released on 18 April 2016.

January 2021 saw The Hics collaborating with Bas once again, releasing the single "Smoke from Fire", which served as a theme song for Bas' Spotify podcast The Messenger. They also appeared on BBE's David Bowie tribute album Modern Love, in which they covered "The Man Who Sold the World". On October 21, 2021, The Hics released their first single in seven years entitled "Caught in a Lie", which serves as the lead single for their upcoming EP scheduled for an early 2022 release via Bas' The Fiends imprint.

Members
Sam Paul Evans – vocals, keyboards, electronics
Rox Barker – vocals, guitar

Former Members
David Turay – saxophone (2012-2014; his death)
Matt Knox – bass guitar (2012-2015)
Geordan Reid-Campbell – guitar, electronics
Jacob Welsh – drums

Discography
 Tangle EP (2013)
 HARMINE EP (2022)

References

External links

The Hics on Facebook

Musical groups established in 2012
Musical groups from London
2012 establishments in England